The Hengshui railway station is a railway station of Jingjiu Railway, Shide Railway, Shiji Passenger Railway that located in Hengshui, Hebei province, China.

History
The station opened in 1940.

References

Railway stations in Hebei
Railway stations in China opened in 1940
Stations on the Qingdao–Taiyuan High-Speed Railway
Stations on the Beijing–Kowloon Railway
Stations on the Shijiazhuang–Dezhou Railway